UHP may refer to:

 UHP (lamp), a mercury-arc lamp used in projectors
 Universal Hall Pass, a pop rock band
  or Henri Poincaré University, a French research university
 Utah Highway Patrol, a police agency in Utah
  or United Brothers of the Proletariat Republican organisation in the Spanish Civil War
 Urea hydrogen peroxide, a reagent in organic synthesis, and also a disinfectant and bleaching agent.
 Ultra high pressure, a mercury lamp invented by Philips for video projectors.
 Uhp, the symbol for the chemical element Unhexpentium
 University Hospitals Plymouth NHS Trust, a hospital group in England.